The Flame (German: Die Flamme) is a 1923 German silent drama film directed by Ernst Lubitsch and starring Pola Negri, Hermann Thimig, and Alfred Abel. The film is based on a play by Hans Müller. In the United States it was released under the alternative title Montmartre. It was the last film Lubitsch made in Germany before emigrating to Hollywood where he directed his first American film Rosita for United Artists the same year.

Plot
As described in a film magazine review for the English subtitled version, Yvette's landlady insists that her lodger pay up the money she owes. The young woman goes out in quest of funds. Papa Lemonier is about to "come across" with the desired cash, when a man who has been pursuing her interferes and trouble starts. Yvette runs away and makes the acquaintance of a youthful composer named Andre Leduc. They fall in love and are married. Raoul Fournier, a rejected suitor, tries to spoil Yvette's domestic happiness by exposing her past to her husband. He almost succeeds, but is defeated in the long run.

Cast

References

Bibliography
 Eyman, Scott (2000). Ernst Lubitsch: Laughter in Paradise. Johns Hopkins University Press.

External links

1923 films
Films of the Weimar Republic
German silent feature films
Films directed by Ernst Lubitsch
Films set in Paris
Films set in the 19th century
German black-and-white films
UFA GmbH films
1920s historical drama films
German historical drama films
1923 drama films
Silent drama films
1920s German films